Autochloris proterva is a moth of the subfamily Arctiinae. It was described by Max Wilhelm Karl Draudt in 1915. It is found in French Guiana.

References

Arctiinae
Moths described in 1915
Moths of South America